Jean Pazzi (7 August 1920 – 22 December 1982) was a French alpine skier. He competed in the men's downhill at the 1948 Winter Olympics.

References

External links
 

1920 births
1982 deaths
French male alpine skiers
Olympic alpine skiers of France
Alpine skiers at the 1948 Winter Olympics
Sportspeople from Alpes-Maritimes